Douradoa is a monotypic genus of flowering plants belonging to the family Olacaceae. The only species is Douradoa consimilis.

Its native range is Brazil.

References

Olacaceae
Monotypic Santalales genera